New Home Township is one of twenty-four townships in Bates County, Missouri, and is part of the Kansas City metropolitan area within the USA.  As of the 2000 census, its population was 222.

History
The township takes its name from the community of New Home, Missouri.

Geography
According to the United States Census Bureau, New Home Township covers an area of 44.63 square miles (115.6 square kilometers); of this, 44.53 square miles (115.32 square kilometers, 99.76 percent) is land and 0.11 square miles (0.28 square kilometers, 0.24 percent) is water.

Unincorporated towns
 New Home at 
 Nyhart at 
(This list is based on USGS data and may include former settlements.)

Adjacent townships
 Charlotte Township (north)
 Mount Pleasant Township (northeast)
 Lone Oak Township (east)
 Osage Township (southeast)
 Howard Township (southwest)
 Walnut Township (west)

Cemeteries
The township contains Thomas Cemetery.

Rivers
 Marias des Cygnes River

Lakes
 Brushy Mound Lake

School districts
 Butler R-V School District
 Hume R-VIII
 Rich Hill R-IV

Political districts
 Missouri's 4th congressional district
 State House District 125
 State Senate District 31

References
 United States Census Bureau 2008 TIGER/Line Shapefiles
 United States Board on Geographic Names (GNIS)
 United States National Atlas

External links
 US-Counties.com
 City-Data.com

Townships in Bates County, Missouri
Townships in Missouri